David Rabadán Lucas  (born 22 May 2000) is a Spanish footballer who plays as a midfielder for CA Osasuna B.

Career 
Rabadán played with Atlético Albacete for three years, before moving on loan to USL Championship side Philadelphia Union II, the reserve team for MLS side Philadelphia Union.

References

External links 
 
 

2000 births
Living people
Footballers from the Community of Madrid
Spanish footballers
Association football midfielders
Segunda División B players
Tercera División players
Atlético Albacete players
Internacional de Madrid players
CA Osasuna B players
USL Championship players
Philadelphia Union II players
Spanish expatriate footballers
Spanish expatriate sportspeople in the United States
Expatriate soccer players in the United States